Almeida  is a common surname in Portuguese-speaking nations of Portugal, Brazil and in West India, which was at one time colonized by the Portuguese. It is a toponym derived from the town of Almeida in Beira Alta Province, Portugal, or for any of a number of similarly named places in Portugal. In other instances it is a toponym derived from Almeida in the Province of Zamora, Spain.

There are several versions for the origin of the name Almeida. But what everyone agrees is that the name is of Arabic origin. Some say that it comes from the Arabic Al Maidda and that it means the table, because the village is located on a vast plateau, on the plateau of the tables. There are also those who claim that it comes from the Arabic Almeidan which means field or place of horse racing. Frei Bernardo de Brito, born in Almeida and chief chronicler of the kingdom, claims that Almeida derives from the configuration of the land on which the village is built and whose original name is Talmeyda.

People

Military and explorers
Francisco de Almeida, Portuguese nobleman, statesman, soldier and explorer
Germano Almeida, Cape Verde author and lawyer
Lourenço de Almeida, Portuguese nobleman, soldier and explorer
Manuel Quintas de Almeida, São Tomé and Príncipe military officer and coup leader
Vasco de Almeida e Costa, Portuguese naval officer

Musicians 
Bruno de Almeida, United States film director and musician
Francisco António de Almeida, Portuguese composer and organist
John Kameaaloha Almeida, Hawaiian guitarist and composer
Laurindo Almeida, Brazilian classical guitarist
Pua Almeida, Hawaiian steel guitarist
Santiago Almeida, United States musician
Antônio Carlos Brasileiro de Almeida Jobim, Brazilian composer

Politicians 
Alfeu Adolfo Monjardim de Andrade e Almeida, Brazilian politician
António de Almeida Santos, Portuguese politician and statesman
António José de Almeida, Portuguese political figure and statesman
Armindo Vaz d'Almeida, São Tomé and Príncipe politician
Cristina Almeida, Spanish lawyer and politician
Damião Vaz d'Almeida, São Tomé and Príncipe politician
Idalba de Almeida, Venezuelan politician
José Américo de Almeida, Brazilian politician and writer 
José António Rondão Almeida, Portuguese politician
Juan Almeida Bosque, Cuban politician
José Luis Martínez-Almeida, Spanish politician
Vicente Almeida d'Eça, last Portuguese governor of Cape Verde

Diplomats 
João Vale de Almeida, European Union diplomat
Luís de Almeida, Angolan diplomat
Tomé Barbosa de Figueiredo Almeida Cardoso, Portuguese diplomat, polyglot and etymologist

Religious 
João Ferreira de Almeida, Portuguese Protestant pastor and Bible translator
John Almeida, English Jesuit missionary in Brazil
José Sebastião de Almeida Neto, Portuguese Catholic Cardinal and former Patriarch of Lisbon
Luciano Mendes de Almeida, Brazilian Jesuit bishop
Luis de Almeida (missionary), Portuguese missionary credited for establishing the first European hospital in Japan
Manuel de Almeida, Portuguese Jesuit priest and missionary

Sports

Football (soccer)
Aílton José Almeida, Brazilian footballer
Alex Dias de Almeida, Brazilian footballer
Ângelo Mariano de Almeida, Brazilian footballer
Anselmo de Almeida, Brazilian footballer
Antonio Gonzaga Almeida, known as Toninho Almeida, Brazilian footballer
Carlos Alberto de Almeida, Brazilian footballer
Cláudio Rogério Almeida Cogo, Brazilian footballer
Daniel Moradei Almeida, Brazilian footballer
Dermival Almeida Lima, Brazilian footballer
Édson Andrade Almeida, Brazilian footballer
Ever Hugo Almeida, Paraguayan footballer
Gabriel Barbosa Almeida, Brazilian footballer
Hugo Almeida, Portuguese footballer
José Augusto de Almeida, Portuguese footballer
José Carlos de Almeida, Brazilian footballer
José Eduardo Bischofe de Almeida, Brazilian footballer
Leandro de Almeida Silva (born 1977), Brazilian footballer
Leandro Almeida da Silva (born 1987), Brazilian footballer
Leandro Marcolini Pedroso de Almeida, Brazilian footballer
Luciano Silva Almeida, Brazilian footballer
Luís Carlos Almeida da Cunha, known as Nani, Portuguese footballer
Magno Santos de Almeida, Brazilian footballer
Marcelo Luis de Almeida Carmo, Brazilian footballer
Marco Almeida (footballer born 1977), Portuguese footballer
Matías Almeyda, Argentine footballer
Mauro Almeida, Portuguese footballer
Paulo Almeida Santos, Brazilian footballer
Paulo Almeida, Brazilian footballer
Peter de Almeida, Brazilian footballer
Robert da Silva Almeida, Brazilian footballer
Rogério de Almeida Florindo dos Santos, Brazilian footballer
Rodrigo Juliano Lopes de Almeida, Brazilian footballer
Rui Almeida Monteiro, Dutch footballer
Vanderson Válter de Almeida, Brazilian footballer
Vinícius Rodrigues Almeida, Brazilian footballer

Other sports
Angélica de Almeida, Brazilian long-distance runner 
Bira Almeida, Brazilian capoeira fighter
Carlos Almeida, Angolan basketballer
Giovanna Almeida Leto, Italian figure skater
Goncalino Almeida, Brazilian horse jockey
Ivan Almeida, Cape Verdean basketball player
João Luis de Almeida, Angolan boxer
Joel Almeida, Mexican basketball player
Kaio de Almeida, Brazilian swimmer
Michel Almeida, Portuguese judoka
Rafael Almeida, Cuban baseballer
Ricardo Almeida, Brazilian mixed martial artist

Writers 
Germano Almeida, Cape Verde author and lawyer
Lúcia Machado de Almeida, Brazilian writer
José Américo de Almeida, Brazilian writer and politician
Kanya D'Almeida, Sri Lankan Sinhala writer and journalist
Manuel Antônio de Almeida, Brazilian journalist and writer
Nicolau Tolentino de Almeida, Portuguese satirical poet
Sarah Hoyt, née Sarah d'Almeida, American science fiction writer of Portuguese origin (publishes historical fiction as Sarah d'Almeida)

Others
Alfonso Almeida, Mexican chess master
Cyril Almeida, Pakistani journalist
Grace d'Almeida (1951–2005), Beninese lawyer
Joaquim de Almeida, Portuguese actor
José Ferraz de Almeida Júnior, Brazilian painter
José Joaquín Almeida (1777–1832), Portuguese Barbary corsair
José Simões de Almeida (sobrinho) (1880–1950), Portuguese sculptor 
Júlia Almeida, Brazilian actress
June Almeida, British virologist
Miguel Osório de Almeida, Brazilian physician and scientist
Miguel Vale de Almeida, Portuguese anthropologist
Tancredo de Almeida Neves, Brazilian statesman

Fictional characters
Tony Almeida, on the American television series 24

References

Galician-language surnames
Portuguese-language surnames
Toponymic surnames